Llanfihangel-ar-Arth is a village and a community in the county of Carmarthenshire, Wales.

The area includes six villages: Alltwalis, Dolgran, Gwyddgrug, Llanfihangel-Ar-Arth, New Inn and Pencader. The population of the community taken at the 2011 census was 2,213.

Location 

The village is located around the B4336 between Llanllwni and Llandysul from the east to west and the B4459 between Capel Dewi and Pencader from the north to south.

Etymology 

Llanfihangel ar Arth is the most northerly village in the community, nearest the river Teifi. It is believed that the village's name derives from the name of the parish church, Sant Mihangel, which was established in the 6th century.

Governance
An electoral ward of the same name exists. This ward stretches beyond the community. The total population of this ward taken at the 2011 census was 2,851.

The community is bordered by the communities of Llanllwni, Llanfihangel Rhos-y-Corn, Llanllawddog, Llanpumsaint, Cynwyl Elfed and Llangeler, all in Carmarthenshire, and by Llandysul in Ceredigion.

History 

There was a toll house in the village during 1840–1850 to collect tolls from travellers, and one of the Rebecca Riots occurred here when the gate was destroyed by 150 people in June 1843. It was a one level building and now it is a residential bungalow.

The railway from Carmarthen and Lampeter travelled through Llanfihangel ar Arth, which later had its own station. But the station was closed for travellers in the 1960s, and only part of the track remains. From the 1840s to 1920s many of the village houses were used as woollen workshops when the wool industry was important in the area.

The resident population of the parish of Llanfihangel-ar-Arth, in the United Kingdom Census 2001 was 2,727 of which 50% were male and 50% were female.

As well as the church, the village has two pubs and a school that opened in 1864 but was closed in 2003. The school now acts as a community centre or village hall. There are quite a few small businesses and the electricity board store. Agriculture  also supplies employment in the area.

The village has an annual carnival.

References

External links 
www.geograph.co.uk : photos of Llanvihangel-ar-Arth and surrounding area

Communities in Carmarthenshire
Villages in Carmarthenshire